The 12th European Women's Artistic Gymnastics Championships were held in Copenhagen, Denmark on 11-12 May 1979.

Medalists

Results

All-around

Vault

Uneven Bars

Balance Beam

Floor

References 

1979
European Artistic Gymnastics Championships
1979 in European sport
International gymnastics competitions hosted by Denmark
1979 in Danish sport
1979 in Danish women's sport